Wacol is a suburb in the City of Brisbane, Queensland, Australia.

Wacol may als refer to:

Wacol railway station, Brisbane, a railway station on the Ipswich railway line in Queensland
Wacol Prison, another name for the Sir David Longland Correctional Centre

See also
Waco (disambiguation)